Rashard Nathan Griffith (born October 8, 1974) is an American former professional basketball player.

Early career
A native of Chicago, Illinois, Griffith starred for the nationally ranked King Jaguars of the Chicago Public League, where he was part of a "twin towers," as King, coached by Landon Cox, had 7'2" Thomas Hamilton and the 7'0" Griffith. Griffith had been considered the top prep center in the country until he was outplayed by Rasheed Wallace at the prestigious Nike Camp in Indianapolis. King won a state championship in 1993, and after dominating the high school ranks and being named Illinois Mr. Basketball, Rashard joined the Wisconsin Badgers college basketball team. Griffith selected Wisconsin over his mother's preference of Purdue University and a long list of other schools, including Arizona, Duke, Kentucky, Michigan, North Carolina, Ohio State, Oklahoma, and Illinois.

College career 
Griffith made his college debut on November 27, 1993 against UW-Milwaukee, posting 27 points, 12 rebounds, six assists, three steals and two blocked shots. Alongside fellow Chicago-area prep stars Michael Finley and Tracy Webster, Griffith helped the Badgers to their first appearance in the NCAA Tournament in 47 years. After averaging 13.9 points and 8.5 rebounds as a freshman, Griffith considered leaving school but ultimately returned. The following season Griffith was named First Team All-Big Ten by the media after averaging 17.2 points and 10.8 rebounds. In only two seasons, Griffith set a Wisconsin individual record for most blocks in a career, later surpassed.

After his sophomore year, Griffith turned pro and was a second round pick in the 1995 NBA Draft.

Professional career
The Milwaukee Bucks made Griffith the 38th overall selection in the 1995 NBA draft. Though he attended summer training camp and was in Milwaukee for individual workouts over the years, Griffith was never able to come to a contract agreement with the team.

Spurning the NBA for a larger contract, Griffith signed to play with Tofaş Bursa in Turkey. He helped the club reach the 1997 Korać Cup final against Aris. Tofas won back-to-back Turkish League titles in 1999 and 2000 during Griffith's second stint. After five years in Turkish and Israeli leagues, Griffith moved to Italian League power Kinder Bologna. There he earned a spot on the All-Euroleague second team during the Euroleague 2000-01 season playing alongside Manu Ginóbili, Marko Jarić and Antoine Rigaudeau. Kinder Bologna won the Triple Crown in Basketball the same year.

After his success in Europe, the Orlando Magic acquired Griffith's draft rights in a trade during the 2002 NBA draft with the intent of adding him to their roster, but Griffith never played in the NBA.

He has also played for Maccabi Tel Aviv in Israel, Tau Cerámica, Tenerife and Calpe in Spain, Lottomatica Roma in Italy and Capitanes de Arecibo in Puerto Rico. He won the 1998 Israeli League with Maccabi and the 2005 Puerto Rican League with Arecibo.

The final club for Griffith was Romanian CSU Asesoft Ploiesti. In 2010, he retired.

Personal life 
Griffith returned to the University of Wisconsin in 2017 to continue his studies, living with former teammate Howard Moore while he took classes. Meanwhile, he became a mentor for the men's basketball team. In May 2020, Griffith graduated with a degree in community and non-profit leadership.

In 2022, Griffith was named head coach of the girls' basketball team at Middleton High School.

References

External links
Rashard Griffith  at acb.com
Rashard Griffith at euroleague.net
Rashard Griffith at tblstat.net
25 Years Later, Rashard Griffith is a Wisconsin Graduate by Big Ten Network on YouTube

1974 births
Living people
African-American basketball players
American expatriate basketball people in Israel
American expatriate basketball people in Italy
American expatriate basketball people in Romania
American expatriate basketball people in Spain
American expatriate basketball people in Turkey
American men's basketball players
Basketball players from Chicago
Capitanes de Arecibo players
Centers (basketball)
CSU Asesoft Ploiești players
Israeli Basketball Premier League players
Karşıyaka basketball players
Liga ACB players
Maccabi Tel Aviv B.C. players
McDonald's High School All-Americans
Milwaukee Bucks draft picks
Pallacanestro Virtus Roma players
Parade High School All-Americans (boys' basketball)
Saski Baskonia players
Tenerife CB players
Tofaş S.K. players
Virtus Bologna players
Wisconsin Badgers men's basketball players
21st-century African-American sportspeople
20th-century African-American sportspeople